Welles is an English locational surname originating from Well, a
village and mill in Lincolnshire.  Its oldest public record is noted ca. 1086. Variations include Well and Wells. People with the name include:

Surname 
 Aaron Welles, a fictional character in the Australian soap opera Home and Away
 Anne Welles, Countess of Ormond (1360–1397)
 Baron Welles (disambiguation)
 Beatice Welles-Smith, daughter of Orson Welles
 Benjamin Welles (1857-1935), American philanthropist 
 Chris Welles Feder, daughter of Orson Welles
 Edmund Welles, an American bass clarinet quartet
 Egon Wellesz (1885–1974), Austrian composer, teacher and musicologist
 Elliot Welles (1927–2006), Holocaust survivor
 Gideon Welles (1802–1878), U.S. Secretary of the Navy, 1861–1869
 Gwen Welles (1947–1993), film and stage actress
 Harry Welles Rusk (1852–1926), U.S. politician
 Jeanne Kohl-Welles, Washington State senator
 Jennifer Welles, American porn star
 Jesse Welles, American voice actress
 Joan Welles, 9th Baroness Willoughby de Eresby (died 1475)
 John de Welles, 5th Baron Welles (1352–1421)
 John Welles, 1st Viscount Welles (1450–1499)
 Justine Welles, a fictional character in the Australian soap opera Home and Away
 Lawson Welles (b. 1975) American film the writer, director and producer
 Lionel de Welles, 6th Baron Welles (1406–1461)
 Marc Welles, actor, grandson of Orson Welles and Rita Hayworth, son of Rebecca Welles
 Mel Welles (1924-2005), American film actor
 Orson Welles (1915–1985), American actor and director
 Rebecca Welles, American television actress, spouse of TV director Don Weis
 Robert Welles, 8th Baron Willoughby de Eresby (executed 1470)
 Samuel Gardner Welles (1913-1981) American journalist
 Samuel Paul Welles (1907–1997), American paleontologist
 Sumner Welles (1892–1961), U.S. Undersecretary of State, 1937–1943
 Terri Welles (born 1956), American flight attendant, "Playmate of the year" 1981, born Terri Knepper
 Thomas Welles (1598–1660), American politician
 Tiffany Welles, a fictional character in the television series Charlie's Angels
 Tori Welles (born 1967), American porn star
 Viscount Welles (disambiguation)
 Wade Welles, in the show Sliders
 William Welles Hollister (1818–1886), a Californian rancher and entrepreneur
 Winthrop Welles Ketcham (1820–1879), American politician
 Welles, American musician

Fictional characters
Wade Welles, a main character from the television series Sliders

Given name
 Welles Crowther (1977–2001), a hero of the 9/11 terrorist attacks on New York City

See also 
 Wells (name)

References